Patriarch Maximus III or Patriarch Maximos III may refer to:

 Maximus III of Constantinople, Ecumenical Patriarch in 1476–1482
 Maximos III Mazloum, patriarch of the Melkite Greek Catholic Church in 1833–1855

See also
 Patriarch (disambiguation)
 Maximus (disambiguation)